The 1986 Virginia State Elections took place on Election Day, November 5, 1986, the same day as the U.S. House elections in the state. The only statewide elections on the ballot were four constitutional referendums  to amend the Virginia State Constitution. Because Virginia state elections are held on off-years, no statewide officers or state legislative elections were held. All referendums were referred to the voters by the Virginia General Assembly.

Question 1

This amendment asked voters to allow any registered voter who has not voted in 4 years to continue to be registered if they make the request in writing and still live at the address listed on the registration records.  This measure eventually overturned by another amendment in 1994.

Question 2

This amendment asked voters to allow public employees (except those who are elected or those who are employed by an elected official) to be appointed assistant voter registrars or election officers.  A similar amendment which was more broad had previously been rejected by voters in 1976.

Question 3

This amendment asked voters to allow the Supreme Court of Virginia to answer questions of state law certified to it by a U.S. federal court or the highest appellate court of another state.

Question 4

This amendment asked voters to give the state a right to appeal certain preliminary dismissals and exclusions of evidence in felony cases.

References

1986 Virginia elections